Dale Ellis (born August 6, 1960) is an American former professional basketball player who played in the National Basketball Association (NBA). At various points in his career, Ellis held the record for the most career 3-point field goals made, until Reggie Miller surpassed him. His 1,719 career made three-pointers ranked 2nd in NBA history at the time of his retirement.

Playing career 
After his time at the University of Tennessee, Ellis was selected ninth overall in the 1983 NBA draft by the Dallas Mavericks. His time as a shooting guard with the Mavericks was rather unremarkable as he played scant minutes and was often relegated to sitting on the bench.

Ellis' fortunes changed dramatically after he found himself traded to the Seattle SuperSonics for Al Wood on July 23, 1986. His playing time increased significantly, and his regular season scoring average reflected this as it jumped from 7.1 points per game with the Mavericks to 24.9 points per game with the SuperSonics. In his Seattle debut, Ellis scored 23 points and grabbed 4 rebounds in a 127–110 win over the Trail Blazers. Ellis' rise with the SuperSonics was recognized around the league, which awarded him the NBA Most Improved Player Award in 1987.

Ellis continued to star for the SuperSonics in the late 1980s. Ellis made four-point plays in a win against the Sacramento Kings on January 26, 1988, becoming the first player in NBA history to complete two four point plays in one game. His scoring average peaked at 27.5 points per game during the 1988–89 season, which would be a career high. That season, on January 5, Ellis scored  49 points in a 120–106 victory over the Kings. The 2,253 points he scored that season broke Spencer Haywood's franchise record of 2,251. Ellis was selected to the NBA All-Star Game during the same season, and scored 27 points for the West. Despite success in Seattle, Ellis' tenure was tumultuous, and included a drunk driving accident in which he was hospitalized, a fist fight with teammate Xavier McDaniel, and a bizarre fight between Ellis' wife, Monique Ellis, and Alton Lister's wife.
In all, Ellis spent four and a half seasons with the SuperSonics before once again being traded, this time to the Milwaukee Bucks for Ricky Pierce. 
While he was again a bench player with the Bucks, his minutes still remained relatively high and Ellis still made large contributions to the team with his scoring ability. Following the conclusion of the 91–92 season, he found himself traded to the San Antonio Spurs for Tracy Murray. As a member of the Spurs, Ellis once again found himself in the starting lineup playing slightly more minutes than he did as a Buck. Although his production largely remained the same, he was doing it more efficiently, shooting nearly 50% from the field as opposed to 46% with Milwaukee.

After signing with the Denver Nuggets, and then later in his career traded to the SuperSonics once again, the Orlando Magic (for whom he never played), again to the Bucks, and the Charlotte Hornets, he saw a more reduced playing role. The Hornets traded him to the Miami Heat after the 1999–2000 season; but was waived prior to the start of the next season.

Ellis played in 1,209 games and had career averages of 15.7 points per game, 3.5 rebounds per game, a .479 field goal percentage, and a .403 three point field goal percentage. He set the NBA record for most minutes played in a single game when he scored 53 points in 69 minutes (out of a possible 73) for the SuperSonics in a 155–154 quintuple-overtime loss to the Bucks on November 9, 1989. His 1,719 career made three-pointers ranked second in NBA history at the time of his retirement.

NBA career statistics

Regular season 

|-
| style="text-align:left;"| 
| style="text-align:left;"| Dallas
| 67 || 2 || 15.8 || .456 || .414 || .719 || 3.7 || .8 || .6 || .1 || 8.2
|-
| style="text-align:left;"| 
| style="text-align:left;"| Dallas
| 72 || 4 || 18.3 || .454 || .385 || .740 || 3.3 || .8 || .6 || .1 || 9.3
|-
| style="text-align:left;"| 
| style="text-align:left;"| Dallas
| 72 || 1 || 15.1 || .411 || .364 || .720 || 2.3 || .5 || .6 || .1 || 7.1
|-
| style="text-align:left;"| 
| style="text-align:left;"| Seattle
| 82 || 76 || 37.5 || .516 || .358 || .787 || 5.5 || 2.9 || 1.3 || .4 || 24.9
|-
| style="text-align:left;"| 
| style="text-align:left;"| Seattle
| 75 || 73 || 37.2 || .503 || .413 || .767 || 4.5 || 2.6 || 1.0 || .1 || 25.8
|-
| style="text-align:left;"| 
| style="text-align:left;"| Seattle
| 82 || 82 || 38.9 || .501 || .478 || .816 || 4.2 || 2.0 || 1.3 || .3 || 27.5
|-
| style="text-align:left;"| 
| style="text-align:left;"| Seattle
| 55 || 49 || 37.0 || .497 || .375 || .818 || 4.3 || 2.0 || 1.1 || .1 || 23.5
|-
| style="text-align:left;"| 
| style="text-align:left;"| Seattle
| 30 || 24 || 26.7 || .463 || .303 || .738 || 3.1 || 2.1 || 1.1 || .1 || 15.0
|-
| style="text-align:left;"| 
| style="text-align:left;"| Milwaukee
| 21 || 0 || 29.7 || .486 || .441 || .707 || 3.9 || 1.5 || .8 || .2 || 19.3
|-
| style="text-align:left;"| 
| style="text-align:left;"| Milwaukee
| 81 || 11 || 27.0 || .469 || .419 || .774 || 3.1 || 1.3 || .7 || .2 || 15.7
|-
| style="text-align:left;"| 
| style="text-align:left;"| San Antonio
| 82 || 76 || 33.3 || .499 || .401 || .797 || 3.8 || 1.3 || 1.0 || .2 || 16.7
|-
| style="text-align:left;"| 
| style="text-align:left;"| San Antonio
| 77 || 75 || 33.6 || .494 || .395 || .776 || 3.3 || 1.0 || .9 || .1 || 15.2
|-
| style="text-align:left;"| 
| style="text-align:left;"| Denver
| 81 || 3 || 24.6 || .453 || .403 || .866 || 2.7 || .7 || .5 || .1 || 11.3
|-
| style="text-align:left;"| 
| style="text-align:left;"| Denver
| 81 || 52 || 32.4 || .479 || .412 || .760 || 3.9 || 1.7 || .7 || .1 || 14.9
|-
| style="text-align:left;"| 
| style="text-align:left;"| Denver
| 82 || 51 || 35.9 || .414 || .364 || .817 || 3.6 || 2.0 || .7 || .1 || 16.6
|-
| style="text-align:left;"| 
| style="text-align:left;"| Seattle
| 79 || 0 || 24.5 || .497 || style="background:#cfecec;"|.464* || .782 || 2.3 || 1.1 || .8 || .1 || 11.8
|-
| style="text-align:left;"| 
| style="text-align:left;"| Seattle
| 48 || 5 || 25.7 || .441 || .433 || .757 || 2.4 || .8 || .5 || .1 || 10.3
|-
| style="text-align:left;"| 
| style="text-align:left;"| Milwaukee
| 18 || 0 || 18.0 || .465 || .354 || .667 || 1.9 || .3 || .3 || .0 || 6.8
|-
| style="text-align:left;"| 
| style="text-align:left;"| Charlotte
| 24 || 5 || 10.0 || .328 || .400 || .750 || .9 || .3 || .3 || .0 || 2.3
|- class="sortbottom"
| style="text-align:center;" colspan="2"| Career
| 1,209 || 589 || 28.8 || .479 || .403 || .784 || 3.5 || 1.4 || .8 || .2 || 15.7
|- class="sortbottom"
| style="text-align:center;" colspan="2"| All-Star
| 1 || 1 || 26.0 || .750 || 1.000 || 1.000 || 6.0 || 2.0 || .0 || .0 || 27.0

Playoffs 

|-
| style="text-align:left;"| 1984
| style="text-align:left;"| Dallas
| 8 || – || 22.3 || .325 || .083 || .750 || 5.3 || .5 || 1.3 || .3 || 7.4
|-
| style="text-align:left;"| 1985
| style="text-align:left;"| Dallas
| 4 || 1 || 17.0 || .435 || .400 || .500 || 1.8 || .8 || 1.0 || .0 || 5.8
|-
| style="text-align:left;"| 1986
| style="text-align:left;"| Dallas
| 7 || 0 || 9.6 || .409 || .583 || 1.000 || 1.0 || .3 || .3 || .3 || 4.3
|-
| style="text-align:left;"| 1987
| style="text-align:left;"| Seattle
| 14 || 14 || 37.9 || .487 || .361 || .815 || 6.4 || 2.6 || .7 || .4 || 25.2
|-
| style="text-align:left;"| 1988
| style="text-align:left;"| Seattle
| 5 || 5 || 34.4 || .482 || .250 || .724 || 4.6 || 3.0 || .6 || .4 || 20.8
|-
| style="text-align:left;"| 1989
| style="text-align:left;"| Seattle
| 8 || 8 || 38.0 || .450 || .405 || .727 || 4.0 || 1.3 || 1.4 || .1 || 22.9
|-
| style="text-align:left;"| 1993
| style="text-align:left;"| San Antonio
| 10 || 10 || 30.5 || .451 || .313 || .813 || 3.5 || 1.1 || .4 || .0 || 12.5
|-
| style="text-align:left;"| 1994
| style="text-align:left;"| San Antonio
| 4 || 4 || 28.5 || .395 || .294 || .600 || 2.5 || .3 || .8 || .0 || 10.5
|-
| style="text-align:left;"| 1995
| style="text-align:left;"| Denver
| 3 || 0 || 24.3 || .357 || .308 || .923 || 4.7 || 1.0 || .7 || .3 || 12.0
|-
| style="text-align:left;"| 1998
| style="text-align:left;"| Seattle
| 10 || 0 || 17.0 || .377 || .423 || .833 || 1.3 || .6 || .2 || .0 || 5.6
|- class="sortbottom"
| style="text-align:center;" colspan="2"| Career
| 73 || 42 || 27.1 || .443 || .351 || .784 || 3.7 || 1.3 || .7 || .2 || 13.8

See also
List of National Basketball Association career games played leaders
List of National Basketball Association career 3-point scoring leaders

References

External links

1960 births
Living people
African-American basketball players
All-American college men's basketball players
American men's basketball players
Basketball players from Marietta, Georgia
Charlotte Hornets players
Dallas Mavericks draft picks
Dallas Mavericks players
Denver Nuggets players
Miami Heat personnel
Milwaukee Bucks players
National Basketball Association All-Stars
Orlando Magic personnel
Parade High School All-Americans (boys' basketball)
San Antonio Spurs players
Seattle SuperSonics players
Shooting guards
Small forwards
Tennessee Volunteers basketball players
21st-century African-American people
20th-century African-American sportspeople